The Margin: The Journal of Applied Economic Research is a peer-reviewed journal that aims to provide a forum for the dissemination of empirical and theoretical knowledge in the broad area of applied economics-specifically in areas such as monetary and fiscal policies, trade and regulation, international investment, rural economics and development economics.

The journal while focussing mainly on the Indian subcontinent has carried historical writings on other parts of the world as well. It is published in association with the National Council of Applied Economic Research.

The journal is a member of the Committee on Publication Ethics (COPE).

Abstracting and indexing 
Margin: The Journal of Applied Economic Research is abstracted and indexed in:

 EBSCO
 Research Papers in Economics (RePEc)
 DeepDyve
 Portico
 Dutch-KB
 ProQuest
 OCLC
 ICI
 Australian Business Deans Council
 Thomson Reuters: Emerging Sources Citation Index (ESCI)
 J-Gate

External links 
 
 Homepage

References 

 COPE
 http://www.ncaer.org/publication_details.php?pID=61

SAGE Publishing academic journals
Publications established in 2007
Economics journals
English-language journals
Quarterly journals